The Ukraine national rugby union team represents Ukraine in men's international rugby union competitions. Nicknamed The Cossacks (Kozaki), is one of the tier 3 teams in Europe that currently compete in the second division of the Rugby Europe International Championships in the Rugby Europe Trophy, a competition which is just below the Rugby Europe Championship where the top 6 countries in Europe (apart from the teams in the Six Nations) compete. They are yet to participate in any Rugby World Cup.

History

Ukraine made their international debut in 1991 against Georgia after the dissolution of the Soviet Union, losing the close game 15-19. The two nations played again three days later, where Georgia won again with the score of 6-0. The following year Ukraine met Georgia once more for a two match series, losing both matches. In their first match of 1993, they defeated Hungary 41-3 for their first ever win since their independence. This was followed by another three wins in succession, against Croatia, Slovenia and Austria. This streak would however end in 1994 with a loss to Denmark.

In 1996 Ukraine defeated Latvia 19-3; the match would be the start of a nine match winning streak) which would be the longest thus far. The wins carried on until 1998, where they lost to the Netherlands 13-35. The late 1990s, Ukraine saw mixed results and defeated teams like Poland and the Czech Republic, but they lost games to the likes of their neighbours Russia, Georgia and Romania.

Ukraine played in the first division of 2005-06 European Nations Cup, the tournament where the best teams in Europe outside of the Six Nations and the tournament that also served as a qualifier for the 2007 Rugby World Cup in France. Ukraine lost all ten of their fixtures and were relegated to Division 2A while within the qualifiers, the bottom three teams went on to Round 4 of the European World Cup qualifiers, so Ukraine would find their selves playing against Russia twice to determine who goes through to the next round of the qualifiers. Ukraine lost both games by the scores 11-25 and 37-17.

Record

World Cup

European Competitions

Overall

Recent Matches

Current Players
The following players were selected for the 2021–22 Rugby Europe Trophy match against  Lithuania.

Head Coach:  Valerii Kochanov

Caps updated:

Recent call-ups
The following players have also been called up to the squad within the last 12 months.

Coaches

Current coaching staff

Former coaches

Notable players
 Andriy Kovalenco
 Vitaly Orlov
 Ivan Soroka and Alex Soroka - Ukrainian qualified Irish underage internationals

See also
 Rugby union in Ukraine
 National Rugby Federation of Ukraine
 Ukraine national rugby sevens team
 Ukraine women's national rugby sevens team
 Sport in Ukraine

References

External links
 rugby.org.ua - Official Site 

Ukraine national rugby union team
Rugby union in Ukraine
Teams in European Nations Cup (rugby union)
European national rugby union teams